A wallride or wall ride is a maneuver in skateboarding in which a rider positions their skateboard parallel to a wall, putting the wheels on the side of the wall as they ride along it. The trick is noted for its particular grace.

History

1970s (early innovators)
The exact originator of the wallride is unknown but it's believed to have been invented in the mid-1970s. The invention of the backside wallride is credited to Rodney Mullen in 1979.

Tom "Wally" Inouye
Tom Inouye, best known for his signature moves, "wall rides" and "backside airs," started IPS (Inouye's Pool Service) back in the '70s, and was one of the first pool skaters. "In 1976 we were riding empty pools," said Inouye. "No one knew what all there was to do, so we were having a good time and seeing how far we could push it." "We were all trying to go up onto the wall. I guess I was the only one who did it," Inouye said. "It became a trick called a 'wall ride' and the name 'Wally' has stuck with me ever since."

1980s (popularization)
By the mid-80s, skaters such as Natas Kaupas and the Gonz exposed the rest of the skate community to wallrides. Kaupas had learned to ride walls where he would throw his skateboard up against a wall and ride off it. He then perfected this trick by riding up the side of walls without using his hands. In 1984 Thrasher Magazine photographer and skating commentator Craig Stecyk took a photo of Kaupas riding off a wall which featured on the cover of Thrasher Magazine's September 1984 issue.
In the 1989 Santa Cruz Streets on Fire video, Natas Kaupas lands a frontside wallride at the beginning of his part.

1990s (second wave)
In the 1990 Speed Wheels video, "Risk it!", Tim Jackson skates Venice beach with unique wallride manoeuvres. 
After a lull in popularity, Rick Howard revived the wallride in 1993 at the end of his part in the Girl/Chocolate Goldfish video. The popularity of wallrides grew in the mid-to-late 90s, with a group of Philadelphia-based skaters bringing the trick to the unique architecture of their city. From Rick Oyola, to Matt Reason, to Serge Trudnowski, to Fred Gall, this group of skaters influenced Donny Barley who was in turn influencing Jamie Thomas. The popularity of wallrides died down again in the late 90s.

2000s-2010s
On August 25, 2004, Brad Edwards and Aaron Murray set the Guinness World Record for highest wallride on a skateboard. Skating at the Juice Magazine - USSA WSA - The Board Gallery - Hollywood Skate Jam taking place in Hollywood, California, Edwards and Murray both reached a height of 7 feet 6inches on the wall.

Starting in the mid 00s through today, wallrides and wallies have experienced a renaissance.

Notable wallrides from 2000s-2010s:

Beyond skateboarding
The term wallride is now used in situations beyond skateboarding, coming to mean the act of traveling across any vertical surface. Wallrides exist in mountain biking, BMXing, Skiing, rollerblading, stock car racing; as well as in video games.

References

External links
 Ryan Reyes - How To's Day: The Wallride

Skateboarding tricks